The electoral history of Nancy Pelosi spans more than three decades, from the mid-1980s to the present. A member of the Democratic Party in the United States, Nancy Pelosi was first elected to the U.S. House of Representatives in a 1987 special election after the death of Congresswoman Sala Burton that February. In the Democratic primary, Pelosi defeated San Francisco Supervisor Harry Britt, considered the more progressive candidate, with 36 percent of the vote to his 32 percent. In the subsequent runoff she defeated Republican Harriet Ross, her closest competitor, by more than a 2–1 margin.

Now in her 18th two-year term, Pelosi has enjoyed overwhelming voter support throughout her congressional career. Since 2013 she has represented , which consists of four-fifths of the city and county of San Francisco. She served as the House Democratic Party leader from 2003 to 2023, and sought election to the office of Speaker of the United States House of Representatives every two years during that time, of which four campaigns were successful.

U.S. House of Representatives

1987 special election

1988 election

1990 election

1992 election

1994 election

1996 election

1998 election

2000 election

2002 election

2004 election

2006 election

2008 election

2010 election

2012 election

2014 election

2016 election

2018 election

2020 election

2022 election

Speaker of the House

2003 election

2005 election

2007 election

2009 election

2011 election

2013 election

2015 regular election

2015 special election

2017 election

2019 election

2021 election

Notes

References

Pelosi, Nancy
Nancy Pelosi